Patterson lake, also known as Hook Lake, is a shallow lake in the western Chilcotin District of the Central Interior of British Columbia, Canada, located south of Tatla Lake.  

This lake on the western edge of the Chilcotin Plateau has no road access and is in the shape of a hook. The outflow is seasonal, and flows down to Tatla Lake Creek to the north. In 2013 the lake and surrounding land was turned into Patterson Lake Provincial Park.  The park is utilized in the winter with a network of cross country ski trails.

References

Lakes of the Chilcotin
Lakes of British Columbia
Range 2 Coast Land District